The Chakra River is a river flowing through Kundapur and Gungolli in western India. It joins with the Souparnika River, Varahi River and Kubja River known as Panchagangavali river and merges into the Arabian Sea.

The Chakra nagar is a small town which is famous because of this river.Chakranagar is on the way to Shivamogga from Mangaluru via  Mastikatte, Nagara. There is also a Chakra dam which was built long ago as a balancing reservoir and does not have sluice gate to the Linganamakki Dam.  Special permission is needed to visit this dam. The Chakra Dam was a KPC project and the chief engineer was B Seetharam.

Rivers of Karnataka
Geography of Udupi district
Rivers of India